Elmarie Gerryts (born 25 August 1972 in Cape Town) is a retired pole vaulter from South Africa.

She finished tenth at the 1999 World Championships and won the silver medal at the 1999 All-Africa Games. She represented her native country at the 2000 Summer Olympics in Sydney, Australia reached the final but had no valid jumps.

A seven-time national champion, she set her personal best of 4.42 metres in June 2000
at a meet in Wesel. This is the current African record.

Competition record

References

External links 

1972 births
Living people
South African female pole vaulters
Athletes (track and field) at the 2000 Summer Olympics
Olympic athletes of South Africa
Athletes (track and field) at the 1998 Commonwealth Games
Sportspeople from Cape Town
Commonwealth Games medallists in athletics
Commonwealth Games silver medallists for South Africa
African Games silver medalists for South Africa
African Games medalists in athletics (track and field)
Athletes (track and field) at the 1999 All-Africa Games
White South African people
Medallists at the 1998 Commonwealth Games